40 Leadenhall Street, also known as Stanza London is an office-led development in London that is currently under construction. It is located within the City of London financial district and is one of a number of new building developments for the area.

Construction commenced in early 2020 with a target completion date of December 2023. US law firm Kirkland & Ellis will be a major occupier from completion.

Site ownership and location
The development site, known as the Leadenhall Triangle, was purchased by Henderson Global Investors in June 2011 for around £190 million.

It is situated in the Aldgate ward in the eastern portion of the City of London, and is a short distance from the Leadenhall Building and the Lloyd's building.

Planning application
In October 2013 Vanquish Properties (UK) Limited Partnership applied for planning permission to construct a building comprising 10, 14 and 34 storeys to a maximum height of 170m(AOD) on a site bounded by 19-21 and 22 Billiter Street, 49 Leadenhall Street, 108 and 109-114 Fenchurch Street, 6-8 and 9-13 Fenchurch Buildings. The listed building at 19 - 21 Billiter Street is to be retained whilst all other existing properties on the site will be demolished.

Planning permission was granted by the City of London Corporation on 29 May 2014, following a resolution to grant permission by the Planning and Transportation Committee on 25 February 2014, subject to certain planning obligations being met.

Following Brexit, the developer announced that construction will only go ahead when a sufficient amount of office space has been pre-let.

In October 2019 it was announced M&G and Prudential have bought the site and will fund its construction for £875m with a final development value of £1.4bn. Build started in 2020 after Keltbray completed clearing the Leadenhall Triangle site. This is despite no pre-let.

Design
The building varies in height by being laid in a series of vertical slices ranging from 7 to 34 stories at the Leadenhall Street end.

Gallery

References

Skyscrapers in the City of London
Proposed skyscrapers in London